Depression Tank is the fifth studio album by Dutch thrash metal band Dead Head, released in early 2009. Dead Head began writing material for Depression Tank in 2006, in the beginning of 2008 they signed a record deal with Displeased Records for the album. Recording of the album began in May 2008.

Track listing

Personnel
Ralph de Boer – bass, vocals
Robbie Woning – guitar
Ronnie van der Wey – guitar
Hans Spijker – drums

Dead Head albums
2008 albums